Gull Harbor is a historic home located at New Bern, Craven County, North Carolina, United States.  It was built about 1810, and is a -story, three bay, side-hall plan, Federal style frame dwelling.

It was listed on the National Register of Historic Places in 1973.

References

Houses on the National Register of Historic Places in North Carolina
Federal architecture in North Carolina
Houses completed in 1810
Houses in New Bern, North Carolina
National Register of Historic Places in Craven County, North Carolina